Miss Roraima is a Brazilian Beauty pageant which selects the representative for the State of Roraima at the Miss Brazil contest. The pageant was created in 1959 and has been held every year since with the exception of 1960-1964, 1969-1970, 1976, 1990-1991, and 1993. The pageant is held annually with representation of several municipalities. Since 2017, the State director of Miss Roraima is, Paulo Silas Valente. Roraima still has yet to win any crowns in the national contest

Gallery of Titleholders

Results Summary

Placements
Miss Brazil: 
1st Runner-Up: Aline Menezes (1996)
2nd Runner-Up: 
3rd Runner-Up: Catarina de Lima Guerra (2004)
4th Runner-Up: 
Top 5/Top 8/Top 9: 
Top 10/Top 11/Top 12: Jéssica Pereira Barros (2021)
Top 15/Top 16: Natali Vitória Lima da Silva (2019); Kalyana Machado Barros (2022)

Special Awards
Miss Photogenic: Janayna Chaves (1995)
Best State Costume: Janaína Coelho (1997)

Titleholders

Miss Roraima
Since 1962, the contest has been called Miss Roraima. There was no delegate in 1963-1964 but the contest returned in 1965 under its new name Miss Roraima.

Miss Território do Rio Branco
From 1959-1962, the contest was called Miss Território do Rio Branco. There was only one delegate ever sent and it was in 1959.

Table Notes

References

External links
Official Miss Brasil Website

Women in Brazil
Roraima
Miss Brazil state pageants